Another Star in the Sky is an album released by David Arkenstone. It was released in 1994 on the Narada label. It was a groundbreaking album because up until this point, a lot of new age music didn't have lyrics or even vocals. David was able to create an album that successfully combined the style of new age music with lyrics to match. The CD release was also one of the first CD Album releases to be mixed for Dolby ProLogic surround sound.

Track listing
"Pool of Radiance" – 5:15
"Far Far Away" – 4:09
"Light in the East" – 4:08
"Under the Canopy" – 4:22
"Voices of the Night" – 4:24
"Another Star in the Sky" – 4:49
"Taken by the Wind" – 5:23
"Canyon of the Moon" – 5:47
"Naked in the Wind" – 5:20
"Ride into Midnight" – 6:47
 All songs composed and arranged by David Arkenstone except 4 & 9 arranged by David Arkenstone, Dan Chase and Eric Lindert

Personnel
 David Arkenstone – keyboards, piano, acoustic and electric guitars, fretless bass, bamboo flutes, percussion and all vocals
 Dan Chase – percussion, drums, data management, samples and effects
 Douglas Spotted Eagle – Native American flute on 9
 Novi Novog – viola on 5 & 8
 Jerome Franke, Mike Giacobassi, Timothy Klabunde, Karin Potts – violins
 Paul Gmeinder – cello
 Helen Reich – viola
 Linda Edelstein – English horn, oboe
 Kostia – orchestrations
 Produced by David Arkenstone and Eric Lindert

References

1994 albums
David Arkenstone albums
Narada Productions albums